Radivoje (Cyrillic script: Радивоје) is a masculine given name of Slavic origin. Notable people with the name include:

Radivoje Brajović (born 1935), President of Montenegro 1986–1988
Radivoje Golubović (born 1990), footballer
Radivoje Janković (1889–1949), general of the Kingdom of Yugoslavia
Radivoje Manić (born 1972), Serbian football player who has played at forward
Radivoje Ognjanović (born 1938), former Yugoslavian football player and manager
Radivoje Papović, Rector of the University of Pristina, Kosovoin 1991–1998 and 2004–2006

See also 
 Radivojević

Slavic masculine given names
Serbian masculine given names